Shadows on the Grand Canal (Italian: Ombre sul Canal Grande) is a 1951 Italian crime film directed by Glauco Pellegrini and starring Isa Pola, Antonio Centa and Carlo Hintermann. It was entered into the competition at the 12th Venice International Film Festival.

Cast 
 Isa Pola as Daniela 
 Antonio Centa as Stefano 
 Carlo Hintermann as Commissioner
  Gianni Cavalieri as Private eye
 Elena Zareschi as Marta
  Emilio Baldanello as Daniela's Father
  Attilio Tosatto as Silvestro Pavani
  Vanda Baldanello as Silvestro Pavani's Wife

References

Bibliography
 Marco Scotini. Carlo Ludovico Ragghianti and the Cinematic Nature of Vision. Charta, 2000.

External links
 

1951 films
1950s Italian-language films
Films set in Venice
Films directed by Glauco Pellegrini
1951 crime films
Italian crime films
Lux Film films
Italian black-and-white films
1950s Italian films